Tampa Executive Airport , formerly known as Vandenberg Airport, is located in unincorporated Hillsborough County, Florida, six nautical miles (11 km) east of the central business district of Tampa. VDF covers 411 acres (166 ha) of land.

The airport was renamed in January 2009 in order to better identify the facility with the Tampa Bay area, and to lessen confusion with Vandenberg Air Force Base in California.

It is a general aviation airport servicing the downtown Tampa business traffic, as it is only 15 minutes from the heart of Tampa. Tampa Executive has two runways, one 3,264 feet and the other 5,000 feet. Tampa Executive is operated by Skyport Aviation, which is the only fixed-base operator on the field providing fuel and other services to general aviation aircraft. The airport is located near the intersection of I-4 and I-75. The airport is open 7:00 A.M. - 10:00 P.M. Monday- Friday and 7:00 A.M. -7:00 P.M. Saturday and Sunday, and after-hours service is available upon request.

The airport's original name was Vandenberg Airport.   Jules Vandenberghe immigrated to this country from Belgium, and started a vegetable farm at this location.  His two sons, Julian and George, later learned to fly and decided to put in an airstrip on their father's farm.  Son George took the airport development seriously, and grew the field into one of the most popular and busiest general aviation airports in Florida.  Many pilots learned to fly there from Eddie Vandenberghe, George's son.  Quite a few private aviation service businesses started and flourished there, including:  Sun State Aviation, Gulf Coast Avionics, Jefferies Aviation, Baker Aircraft Service, Dodge Aviation, Hawk Aircraft Refinishing, and more. The Hillsborough County Sheriff's Department Aviation unit has been based there for over 40 years.

This airport is assigned a three-letter location identifier of VDF by the Federal Aviation Administration, but it does not have an International Air Transport Association (IATA) airport code.

References

External links
 
 Skyport Aviation, operator of Tampa Executive Airport
 
 

Airports in Florida
Transportation buildings and structures in Hillsborough County, Florida
Airports in the Tampa Bay area